The Bureaucrat(s) may refer to:

 The Bureaucrats (1936 film), a French film
 The Bureaucrats (1959 film), a film by Henri Diamant-Berger and Charles Van Enger
The Bureaucrats (Les employés The Government Clerks, 1841) unfinished work by Honore de Balzac
 Officialdom Unmasked ("The Bureaucrats: A Revelation"), a Chinese novel
 The Bureaucrat, a 1944 novelette by Malcolm Jameson
 The Bureaucrat, Inc., a 2004 acquisition by Logistics Management Institute

See also
 Bureaucrat